Schenkel is a surname of Dutch, German, and Ashkenazi origin. Notable people with the surname include:

Alexia Arisarah Schenkel (born 1996), Swiss-Thai alpine skier
Allan von Schenkel (born 1975), American musician
Andrea Maria Schenkel (born 1962), German writer
Cal Schenkel (born 1947), American artist
Carl Schenkel (born 1948), Swiss film director
Chris Schenkel (1923–2005), American sportscaster
Daniel Schenkel (1813–1885), Swiss Protestant theologian
Danny Schenkel (born 1978), Dutch footballer
 Eli Schenkel (born 1992), Canadian Olympic fencer
Gary W. Schenkel, US Department of Homeland Security official
Gerd Schenkel (born 1969), German-Australian businessperson
Lukas Schenkel (born 1984), Swiss footballer
Martin Schenkel (1968–2003), Swiss actor and musician
Reto Schenkel (born 1988), Swiss sprinter
Scott Schenkel, American business executive, CEO of eBay

See also
Schenkel (Rotterdam Metro), Dutch subway station

References